The Plaza de Zocodover is a square of the city of Toledo, in the autonomous community of Castile-La Mancha, Spain. It was the nerve center of the city during most of its history, acting as its main square. A part of it was designed by Juan de Herrera during the reign of Philip II.

Here horses, donkeys, foals, mares, mules and other beasts were sold, when the city of Toledo was Spanish-Muslim city.

Here the most important market of the city took place. It has been devastated as a weekly market for centuries. Today it occurs on Tuesdays in the vicinity of Paseo de Merchán or de la Vega.

History 
The origin of the name Zocodover comes from the Arabic language sūq ad-dawābb, which means "market of burden beasts". This place was also the place where bullfighting and the cucañas were organized in the celebrations of the locality. It has been, therefore, the nerve center of the social life of the city since medieval times. But Zocodover was also a center for more mournful acts like the autos-da-fé of the Inquisition or the public execution of the prisoners.

It is when the old square was destroyed by a fire on October 29, 1589 that the decision was taken to build a new one. In 1854 an ambitious project is drawn up, by the hand of the technician Santiago Martín Ruiz, to reorganize the plaza de Zocodover, transforming it into a rectangular portico square.

Reforms 
Several attempts have been made to widen the square, although of these two are the most outstanding;

The first and oldest date of the time of the Catholic Monarchs, approved by the same Isabella of Castile in 1502. The proposal came from the same municipality of Toledo and was authorized to all its organs the remodeling of this one, since the former square was too narrow, and since the Alcázar lacked an appropriate place they wanted to join both to the front facade of the building.

To do this, a wall would rise to overcome the gap to the postern of San Miguel and also were regulated its characteristics, among which it highlight the construction of typical arcades of Castilian architecture.

This colossal work was never put into practice since, considering the technical possibilities of the time and the high slope from Zocodover to the main facade of the Alcázar, 23 meters high, the difficulty became very heavy adding to this the fact that to be able to lower the land would have to have dug in living rock.

The second expansion was done and dates from the beginning of the 17th century. This consisted in the demolition of a series of houses of little value that seems to be difficult the total vision of Zocodover from its top to the bottom and vice versa. Never more arches were realized and probably this fact is due to that it was not wanted to remove meters to the square.

Nowadays Zocodover is one of the places of the city where many events and celebrations are held, as well as serving as a popular meeting point and enjoyment of the Toledo and above all a must for the thousands of tourists who mark the streets of the historical quarter throughout the year.

References

Plazas in Toledo, Spain